Prometopus is a genus of moths of the family Noctuidae.

Species
 Prometopus albistigma (Swinhoe, 1904)
 Prometopus asahina (Kobes, 1985)
 Prometopus inassueta Guenée, 1852
 Prometopus flavicollis Leech

References
Natural History Museum Lepidoptera genus database
Prometopus at funet

Hadeninae